I Nengah Sulendra (born on May 25, 1985) is an Indonesian footballer who currently plays as a defender for Perseden Denpasar in Liga 3 (Indonesia).

References

Living people
1985 births
Association football defenders
Indonesian footballers
Indonesian Hindus
Liga 1 (Indonesia) players
Bali United F.C. players
Balinese people
People from Karangasem Regency
Sportspeople from Bali